Laura Melahn joined GV (formerly Google Ventures) in 2011 and is a partner on the investing team. Previously, she established GV’s marketing function, working with the fund's portfolio companies on branding and growth.

Melahn named Calico, Alphabet’s company aiming to slow aging and counteract age-related diseases. Previously, she worked on the Google marketing team, where she developed the Street View snowmobile for the 2010 Winter Olympics and expanded Street View to cover all 50 U.S. states.

Education
Melahn studied molecular biology and graduated with honors from Princeton University. She conducted research at the Cancer Research Center of Hawaii and at University of Oxford in the biochemistry department.

References

Living people
Year of birth missing (living people)